Women at the Top is an Australian television series which aired in 1959 on ABC in Sydney. It was an interview series hosted by Peter MacGregor, and featured interviews with women who were successful in their respective fields. Aired in a 30-minute time-slot, in black-and-white, it was a spin-off from Men at the Top. Both series were short-lived, however it is worth noting that ABC series typically ran for shorter seasons than shows on commercial television.

Episode status
An episode or two may be held as kinescope recordings by National Film and Sound Archive.

References

External links
Women at the Top at IMDb

1959 Australian television series debuts
1959 Australian television series endings
Black-and-white Australian television shows
English-language television shows
Australian television talk shows
Australian Broadcasting Corporation original programming
History of women in Australia